Anthony Rogers may refer to:

Anthony A. C. Rogers (1821–1899), American politician
Anthony Rogers (actor), British actor
Anthony Rogers (motorcyclist) (born 1990), British motorcycle racer
Rufus Rogers (Anthony Trevelyan Rogers, 1913–2009), New Zealand politician of the Labour Party
Buck Rogers, a fictional character originally called Anthony Rogers

See also
Tony Rogers (disambiguation)
Anton Rodgers (1933–2007), English actor
Anton Rodgers (footballer) (born 1993), Irish football player